TMF Dance (formerly TMF Party) was a digital theme channel part of MTV Networks Benelux.

The channel, along with the channels TMF Pure, TMF NL, and Nick Jr., launched on 1 May 2005. The purpose of the TMF Dance was to play a nonstop mix of dance music. On 31 December 2011 all TMF channels, including TMF Dance, were closed down due to MTV strengthening its own brand.

References

Music television channels
Defunct television channels in the Netherlands
Television channels in Flanders
Television channels in Belgium
Television channels and stations established in 2005
Television channels and stations disestablished in 2011
Music organisations based in the Netherlands